Phosphorus pentachloride is the chemical compound with the formula PCl5. It is one of the most important phosphorus chlorides, others being PCl3 and POCl3. PCl5 finds use as a chlorinating reagent.  It is a colourless, water-sensitive and moisture-sensitive solid, although commercial samples can be yellowish and contaminated with hydrogen chloride.

Structure
The structures for the phosphorus chlorides are invariably consistent with VSEPR theory. The structure of PCl5 depends on its environment. Gaseous and molten PCl5 is a neutral molecule with trigonal bipyramidal geometry and (D3h) symmetry. This trigonal bipyramidal structure persists in nonpolar solvents, such as CS2 and CCl4. In the solid state PCl5 is an ionic compound, formulated .

In solutions of polar solvents, PCl5 undergoes self-ionization.  Dilute solutions dissociate according to the following equilibrium:

PCl5   + Cl−

At higher concentrations, a second equilibrium becomes more prevalent:

2 PCl5   + 

The cation  and the anion  are tetrahedral and octahedral, respectively. At one time, PCl5 in solution was thought to form a dimeric structure, P2Cl10, but this suggestion is not supported by Raman spectroscopic measurements.

Related pentachlorides
AsCl5 and SbCl5 also adopt trigonal bipyramidal structures. The relevant bond distances are 211 pm (As−Cleq), 221 pm (As−Clax), 227 pm (Sb−Cleq), and 233.3 pm (Sb−Clax). At low temperatures, SbCl5 converts to the dimer, dioctahedral Sb2Cl10, structurally related to niobium pentachloride.

Preparation
PCl5 is prepared by the chlorination of PCl3.  This reaction is used to produce around 10,000 tonnes of PCl5 per year (as of 2000).
PCl3 +  Cl2  PCl5  (ΔH = −124 kJ/mol)

PCl5 exists in equilibrium with PCl3 and chlorine, and at 180 °C the degree of dissociation is about 40%. Because of this equilibrium, samples of PCl5 often contain chlorine, which imparts a greenish coloration.

Reactions

Hydrolysis
In its most characteristic reaction, PCl5 reacts upon contact with water to release hydrogen chloride and give phosphorus oxides. The first hydrolysis product is phosphorus oxychloride:
PCl5 + H2O  →  POCl3 + 2 HCl

In hot water, hydrolysis proceeds completely to orthophosphoric acid:
PCl5  +  4 H2O   →   H3PO4  +  5 HCl

Lewis acidity
Phosphorus pentachloride is a Lewis acid.  This property underpins many of its characteristic reactions, autoionization, chlorinations, hydrolysis.  A well studied adduct is PCl5(pyridine).

Chlorination of organic compounds
In synthetic chemistry, two classes of chlorination are usually of interest: oxidative chlorinations and substitutive chlorinations. Oxidative chlorinations entail the transfer of Cl2 from the reagent to the substrate. Substitutive chlorinations entail replacement of O or OH groups with chloride. PCl5 can be used for both processes.

Upon treatment with PCl5, carboxylic acids convert to the corresponding acyl chloride. The following mechanism has been proposed:

It also converts alcohols to alkyl chlorides. Thionyl chloride is more commonly used in the laboratory because the resultant sulfur dioxide is more easily separated from the organic products than is POCl3.

PCl5 reacts with a tertiary amides, such as dimethylformamide (DMF), to give dimethylchloromethyleneammonium chloride, which is called the Vilsmeier reagent, [(CH3)2N=CClH]Cl.  More typically, a related salt is generated from the reaction of DMF and POCl3.  Such reagents are useful in the preparation of derivatives of benzaldehyde by formylation and for the conversion of C−OH groups into C−Cl groups.

It is especially renowned for the conversion of C=O groups to CCl2 groups.  For example, benzophenone and phosphorus pentachloride react to give the diphenyldichloromethane: 
(C6H5)2CO  +  PCl5  →   (C6H5)2CCl2  +  POCl3

The electrophilic character of PCl5 is highlighted by its reaction with styrene to give, after hydrolysis, phosphonic acid derivatives.

Comparison with related reagents
Both PCl3 and PCl5 convert R3COH groups to the chloride R3CCl.  The pentachloride is however a source of chlorine in many reactions.  It chlorinates allylic and benzylic CH bonds.  PCl5 bears a greater resemblance to SO2Cl2, also a source of Cl2.  For oxidative chlorinations on the laboratory scale, sulfuryl chloride is often preferred over PCl5 since the gaseous SO2 by-product is readily separated.

Chlorination of inorganic compounds
As for the reactions with organic compounds, the use of PCl5 has been superseded by SO2Cl2.  The reaction of phosphorus pentoxide and PCl5 produces POCl3 :

6 PCl5  +  P4O10 → 10 POCl3

PCl5 chlorinates nitrogen dioxide to form unstable nitryl chloride:

PCl5  +  2 NO2 →  PCl3 +  2 NO2Cl
2 NO2Cl → 2 NO2 + Cl2

PCl5 is a precursor for lithium hexafluorophosphate, LiPF6.

PCl5  +  6 LiF  →  LiPF6 +  5 LiCl

Safety
PCl5 is a dangerous substance as it reacts violently with water. It is also corrosive when in contact with skin and can be fatal when inhaled.

History 

Phosphorus pentachloride was first prepared in 1808 by the English chemist Humphry Davy.  Davy's analysis of phosphorus pentachloride was inaccurate; the first accurate analysis was provided in 1816 by the French chemist Pierre Louis Dulong.

See also
 Phosphorus halides
 Phosphorus trichloride
 Phosphoryl chloride
 Phosphorus trifluorodichloride

References

External links

 The period 3 chlorides
 International Chemical Safety Card 0544
 CDC - NIOSH Pocket Guide to Chemical Hazards

Phosphorus chlorides
Hypervalent molecules
Phosphorus(V) compounds